Kiwo Ayiti (Creole name) or Mouvement Kiro d'Haïti (French name) a Catholic youth organization in the Haiti. Kiwo Ayiti is a member of the Catholic umbrella of youth organizations Fimcap.

History 
Kiwo Ayiti was founded in 1960 by Flemish missionary following the example of the Catholic Belgian youth organization Chiro Flanders.

Activities

International partnerships 
Kiwo Ayiti is a member of the Catholic umbrella of youth organizations Fimcap. Within Fimcap Kiwo Ayiti has got an intercontinental partnership with Chiro Flanders. The partnership includes mutual visits and exchanges about youth work.

Organization 
Kiwo Ayiti has about 60,000 children and young people as members. They are directed by about 4,500 youth leaders and meet in about 600 local groups. Kiwo Ayiti is present in all of the ten dioceses of the Roman Catholic church in Haiti.

Kiwo Ayiti is structured in the following sections (based on age-groups):

References

Catholic youth organizations
Youth organizations based in Haiti
Fimcap
Catholic Church in Haiti
Youth organizations established in 1960
1960 establishments in North America